is a Japanese Buddhist leader. He was the fifth president of Soka Gakkai from 18 July 1981 to 9 November 2006. After his resignation from that position, he became the chairman of the Supreme Leader Meeting of Soka Gakkai in November 2006. He was also the manager of the Men's Division, the Youth Division of Soka Gakkai, the chairman of the Central Meeting and Kofu Shimbun Meeting of Soka Gakkai, the supreme advisor of Sōka University, the honorary director of Tokyo Fuji Art Museum, the supreme advisor of the Min-On Concert Association, the director of the Toda Institute for Global Peace and Policy Research and the acting president of Soka Gakkai International (SGI).

Early life
Akiya was born in Tokyo. He attended Tokyo Metropolitan Bunkyo High School. After graduating from Waseda University with a B.A. degree in French Literature, he went to work at the Seikyo Shimbun company, one of Japan's daily newspapers. He also acted as its copy chief.

Soka Gakkai presidency

References

Japanese religious leaders
Japanese Buddhists
1930 births
Living people
Members of Sōka Gakkai
Nichiren Buddhists
Waseda University alumni